King Petar of Serbia is a 2018 Serbian war film directed by Petar Ristovski, starring Lazar Ristovski and Radovan Vujović. The screenplay is based on Milovan Vitezović's 1994 novel King Petar's socks. It was selected as the Serbian entry for the Best International Feature Film at the 92nd Academy Awards, but it was not nominated and the  best film at the Festival of Serbian film in Chicago.

Plot
Peter I of Serbia was banished from Serbia as a young man. Many years later, he returns to his country to liberate its people and secure parliamentary democracy and later lead the country during World War I.

Cast

See also
 List of submissions to the 92nd Academy Awards for Best International Feature Film
 List of Serbian submissions for the Academy Award for Best International Feature Film

References

External links
 

2018 films
2010s Serbian-language films
2018 war drama films
Films set in the 20th century
Films set in Serbia
Films set in Belgrade
Films with screenplays by Milovan Vitezović
Serbian war drama films
Biographical films about Serbian royalty
2018 drama films
Cultural depictions of Peter I of Serbia
Films shot in Serbia
Cultural depictions of Alexander I of Yugoslavia